Alan Thomson may refer to:
Alan Thomson (cricketer) (1945–2022), former Australian cricketer and Australian rules football umpire
Alan Thomson (sportsman, born 1899) (1899–1938), Australian cricketer and Australian rules footballer
Alan Thomson (canoeist) (born 1961), Canadian canoer
Alan Thomson (musician) (born 1960), bass player and vocalist

See also
Alan Thompson (disambiguation)